Gongsan Dam is a dam in Jimyo-dong, Dong-gu, Daegu, South Korea.  Built across the Donghwacheon stream flowing south from Palgongsan, the dam is responsible for securing the water supply for much of northern Daegu.

The dam's construction began in 1979 and was completed in 1981.  Since then, the use of much of the surrounding land has been restricted, due to concerns that development might lead to a loss of water quality.  Local residents have protested these restrictions from time to time.

See also
List of dams

Buildings and structures in Daegu
Dams in South Korea
Dams completed in 1981